Statistics of Primera División Uruguaya for the 1941 season.

Overview
It was contested by 11 teams, and Nacional won the championship. Nacional are still the only team to have scored a 100% record during a Primera Division season.

League standings

References
Uruguay - List of final tables (RSSSF)

Uruguayan Primera División seasons
Uru
1941 in Uruguayan football